Gareth Evans can refer to two different rugby union players born in 1991:

 Gareth Evans (rugby union, born August 1991), New Zealand rugby union player
 Gareth Evans (rugby union, born September 1991), English rugby union player